Kyrgyzstan competed at the 2014 Summer Youth Olympics, in Nanjing, China from 16 August to 28 August 2014.

Medalists

Canoeing

Kyrgyzstan qualified one boat based on its performance at the 2013 World Junior Canoe Sprint and Slalom Championships.

Boys

Equestrian

Kyrgyzstan qualified a rider.

Judo

Kyrgyzstan qualified one athlete based on its performance at the 2013 Cadet World Judo Championships.

Individual

Team

Modern Pentathlon

Kyrgyzstan qualified one athlete based on its performance at the Asian and Oceania YOG Qualifiers and another based on the 1 June 2014 Olympic Youth A Pentathlon World Rankings.

Shooting

Kyrgyzstan was given a wild card to compete.

Individual

Team

Weightlifting

Kyrgyzstan qualified 1 quota in the boys' events based on the team ranking after the 2014 Weightlifting Youth & Junior Asian Championships.

Boys

References

2014 in Kyrgyzstani sport
Nations at the 2014 Summer Youth Olympics
Kyrgyzstan at the Youth Olympics